José Luis López may refer to:
José Luis López Aranguren, Spanish philosopher, see Prince of Asturias Awards
José Luis López Rubio or José López Rubio, Spanish film writer and director
José Luis López Vázquez (1922–2009), Spanish film and TV actor
José Luis López (Costa Rican footballer), Costa Rican footballer
José Luis López (Mexican footballer) (born 1979), Mexican footballer
José Luis López (boxer) (born 1973), Mexican boxer
José Luis López (handballer) (born 1998), Chilean handball player

See also
José López (disambiguation)
Luis Lopez (disambiguation)